iTunes Session is an extended play (EP) by Australian electronic musician Chet Faker. It was released on 28 November 2014 exclusively on the iTunes Store through Future Classic. The six-track EP was recorded at Studios 301 in Sydney and features live versions of tracks originally for his debut album Built on Glass with the exception of "I'm Into You" which appeared on his 2012 debut EP, Thinking in Textures. The EP debuted and peaked at number 18 on the ARIA Albums Chart.

Background
During 2014, Faker won five awards at the 2014 ARIA Awards, had a number 1 album in Australia and was given the J Award for Australian Album of the Year after recording and releasing his own iTunes Sessions album. "Gold" was given a solo piano rendition, while "Talk Is Cheap" features a cello.

Track listing

Charts

Release history

References

2014 live albums
2014 EPs
Live EPs
ITunes Session
Chet Faker albums
Indie pop EPs